Lindsay Seemann (born September 22, 1992) is a Canadian swimmer who participated in the 200-metre backstroke at the 2008 Summer Olympics.  At 15, she was the youngest athlete on the Canadian Olympic team.

She was born and raised in Newmarket, Ontario and started her swimming career for the Newmarket Stingrays.  Seemann swam for the University of Arizona Wildcats from 2010 to 2012, before transferring to the University of Iowa, where she swam for the Iowa Hawkeyes from 2012 to 2014.  She retired from competitive swimming in 2014, having won 18 national races and 48 provincial ones.

References

External links
Swimming Canada - 2008 Olympic Games team
Lindsay has good results (and some fun)in Vancouver

1992 births
Living people
Arizona Wildcats women's swimmers
Canadian female backstroke swimmers
Iowa Hawkeyes women's swimmers
Olympic swimmers of Canada
Sportspeople from Newmarket, Ontario
Sportspeople from Ontario
Swimmers at the 2008 Summer Olympics